The Soul Keeper is a 2002 Italian-French-British romance-drama film directed by Roberto Faenza. It is loosely based on real life events of Russian psychoanalyst and physician Sabina Spielrein and notably on her therapeutic and sentimental relationship with fellow psychoanalyst Carl Gustav Jung.

Plot 
Marie and Fraser, two young scholars, respectively French and Scottish, get to know each other while they are both in Moscow to research the life of the Russian psychoanalyst Sabina Spielrein. The two researchers reconstruct Sabina's life together, starting with her hospitalisation in Zürich in 1904 for a serious form of hysteria.

There the patient meets the young doctor Carl Gustav Jung, who, using the new methods of psychoanalysis developed by Freud, will be able to cure her. Sabina begins to take an interest in psychoanalysis herself, and begins an intense love affair with Jung. However, discovering that her beloved Carl, married and with two children, although in love with her is trapped to moral doubts, Sabina provokes a scandal. The two finally separate.

Cast 

Emilia Fox: Sabina Spielrein
Iain Glen: Carl Gustav Jung
Craig Ferguson: Richard Fraser
Caroline Ducey: Marie Franquin
Jane Alexander: Emma Jung
Joanna David: Sabina's mother
Viktor Sergachyov: Ivan Ionov
Giovanni Lombardo Radice: Zorin

See also

 A Dangerous Method
 The Wicked (1991 film)

References

External links

The Soul Keeper at FilmAffinity

2002 films
2002 biographical drama films
2002 romantic drama films
English-language Italian films
Films directed by Roberto Faenza
Cultural depictions of Carl Jung
Italian biographical drama films
Films set in Switzerland
Films about the Soviet Union in the Stalin era
Holocaust films
Films set in the 1900s
Films set in the 1940s
Italian romantic drama films
2000s English-language films